Villawood Immigration Detention Centre, originally Villawood Migrant Hostel or Villawood Migrant Centre, split into a separate section named Westbridge Migrant Hostel from 1968 to 1984, is an Australian immigration detention facility located in the suburb of Villawood in Sydney, Australia.

Built in 1949 to accommodate post-war refugees from Europe, a section of the original camp was converted into an immigration detention centre in 1976.

History

Villawood Migrant Hostel 
The site of the detention centre was previously known as the Villawood Migrant Hostel or Villawood Migrant Centre, built in 1949 to house migrants from post-war Europe to work in local industries. The centre was run by Commonwealth Hostels Ltd, a non-profit company. By 1964 the centre housed 1,425 people, mainly from Britain and Europe. By 1969 it was the largest migrant hostel in Australia, and was at that time housing migrants from Britain, The Netherlands, Denmark, West Germany, France, Czechoslovakia, Yugoslavia and Turkey. In 1968 the centre was divided into two sections, one named the Villawood Migrant Hostel and the other named the Westbridge Migrant Hostel, which operated until 1984.

Conversion to a detention centre 
In 1976 a small section of the hostel was converted to provide security accommodation for persons awaiting deportation. This new section was named the Villawood Immigration Detention Centre.

In 2001 the Villawood Immigration Detention Centre was the subject of controversy when 40 asylum seekers escaped. A month later, a Four Corners documentary, "The Inside Story", revealed the plight of six-year-old Iranian refugee Shayan Bedraie, who had been refusing to speak or eat. Shayan and his family had been detained at Woomera IRPC for 11 months and Villawood IDC for at least 6 months, and had witnessed a number of riots and self-harm incidents. He was periodically taken to hospital to be drip-fed and rehydrated, and then returned to detention.

Management of the centre was outsourced to private company G4S Australia from 2003 to 2009. 

In January 2008, the Human Rights and Equal Opportunity Commission (HREOC) said the high-security section of Villawood Detention Centre was the "most prison like" of all Australia's immigration detention centres, and demanded it be closed immediately. The HREOC described the infrastructure as dilapidated, and conditions inside the detention centre as "harsh and inhospitable".

Early in the morning of Thursday 21 April 2011, the centre was set alight by detainees.

In 2020 the centre adopted various measures in response to the COVID-19 pandemic in Australia, but human rights organisations including HREOC have called upon the Australian Government to allow detainees to release detainees into the community to  better protect themselves against COVID-19, as social distancing is not possible in the centre.

In 2023 another man detained at the centre died in what is believed to be a suicide. The man, originally from Iraq, was found lifeless in his cell after living at the centre for five years.

Description
Villawood Detention Centre is located at 15 Birmingham Avenue, Villawood.

It houses a mix of asylum seekers, people who have overstayed their visas and Section 501 detainees who have had their visas cancelled following criminal convictions and are awaiting deportation after serving prison sentences. At 31 May 2021 it held 485 people including 278 Section 501 visa cancellations, 74 asylum seekers who arrived by boat, and 133 detainees in other categories.

People refused entry into the country at international airports and seaports may also be detained there. The centre has been the focus of much controversy, with accusations of human rights abuses.

Since 2009 the centre has been managed by private prison company Serco. with  the Australian Border Force, an agency of the Department of Immigration and Border Protection, responsible for the welfare of the detainees.

See also 
 List of Australian immigration detention facilities
 ChilOut
 We Can Be Heroes: Finding The Australian of the Year

References

Further reading

</ref>

External links 
 

1976 establishments in Australia
Prisons in Sydney
Immigration detention centres and prisons of Australia
Migrant hostels in Australia
Private prisons in Australia
Serco